Akira Tana (born March 14, 1952 in San Jose, California) is an American jazz drummer.

Biography
Tana grew up in Palo Alto, graduating from Gunn High School in 1970.  Tana then obtained a bachelor's degree from Harvard University in the social sciences, playing gigs on the side, then enrolled at the New England Conservatory of Music. There he performed in both classical and jazz idioms, playing with the Boston Symphony Orchestra and student ensembles as well as with musicians such as Helen Humes, Milt Jackson, Sonny Rollins, George Russell, and Sonny Stitt.

Tana recorded frequently as a sideman in the 1980s, and began releasing albums as a leader in the 1990s. He formed a group, Tana Reid, with Rufus Reid, and added Kei Akagi on occasion to form the Asian-American Jazz Trio. Tana's performing and recording associations include Charles Aznavour, Ran Blake, Ray Bryant, Al Cohn, Chris Connor, Art Farmer, Carl Fontana, Dizzy Gillespie, Benny Golson, Jim Hall, Jimmy Heath, Lena Horne, J.J. Johnson, Warne Marsh, Tete Montoliu, James Moody, Spike Robinson, Jimmy Rowles, Zoot Sims, Cedar Walton, and Frank Wess.

Discography

As TanaReid
With Rufus Reid
 Yours and Mine (Concord Jazz, 1991)
 Passing Thoughts (Concord Jazz, 1992)
 Blue Motion (Paddle Wheel, 1993)
 Rumour with Charles Licata Rumour (Charles Publishing, 1995)
 Looking Forward (Evidence, 1995)
 Back to Front (Evidence, 1998)

As leader
 Secret Agent Men (Sons of Sound, 2002)
 Moon Over The World (Sons of Sound, 2004)
 Kiss Kiss Bang Bang with Annie Sellick (Sons of Sound, 2011)
 Sound Poetry with Ken Berman and Kai Eckhardt (Mmgmusic, 2014)
 JAZZaNOVA  (Vegamusic, 2017)

As Akira Tana and Otonowa
With Masaru Koga, Saki Kono, Art Hirahara and Ken Okada
 Otonowa (Vegamusic, 2013)
 Stars Across the Ocean (Vegamusic, 2016)
  (Vegamusic, 2019)

As sideman
With James Moody
 Sweet and Lovely (Novus, 1989)
 Honey (Novus, 1991)

With Zoot Sims
 I Wish I Were Twins (Pablo, 1981)
 Suddenly It's Spring (Pablo, 1983)

With others
 Warne Marsh, Posthumous (Interplay, 1985)
 Claudio Roditi, Claudio! (Uptown, 1985)
 Jim Hall, Jim Hall's Three (Concord Jazz, 1986)
 Chris Connor,  Classic (Contemporary, 1987)
 Spike Robinson – Al Cohn Quintet, Henry B. Meets Alvin G. 'Once In A Wild'  (Capri, 1987)
 Rob Schneiderman, New Outlook (Reservoir, 1988)
 J.J. Johnson, Vivian (Concord Jazz, 1992)
 Tete Montoliu, A Spanish Treasure (Concord Jazz, 1992)

References

"Akira Tana". The New Grove Encyclopedia of Popular Music (accessed via Oxford Music Online).

External links
AKIRA TANA
AKIRA TANA and OTONOWA

1952 births
Living people
American jazz drummers
Musicians from San Jose, California
American musicians of Japanese descent
Harvard University alumni
20th-century American drummers
American male drummers
New England Conservatory alumni
Jazz musicians from California
20th-century American male musicians
American male jazz musicians
Gunn High School alumni